Charles Halleck "Bud" Edwards (March 21, 1908 – August 11, 1986) was an American football player. He played college football for Brown and in the National Football League (NFL) as a back for the Providence Steam Roller in 1930 and 1931 and for the Chicago Bears in 1931. He appeared in 19 NFL games, seven as a starter.

References

1908 births
1986 deaths
Brown Bears football players
Providence Steam Roller players
Chicago Bears players
Players of American football from Illinois